Settlements, within municipalities in Slovenia, and sometimes called Log include:
 Those distinguished by the name of the including municipality:
Log v Bohinju, in Bohinj
Log, Kranjska Gora
Log, Lukovica
Log, Mokronog-Trebelno
Log, Rogatec
Log, Ruše
Log, Sevnica
Log nad Škofjo Loko, in Škofja Loka
 Those distinguished other than by the name of the including municipality:
Log pod Mangartom (in Bovec)
Log pri Brezovici (in Log–Dragomer)
Log pri Mlinšah (in Zagorje ob Savi)
Log pri Polhovem Gradcu (in Dobrova–Polhov Gradec)
Log pri Vrhovem (in Radeče)
Log pri Žužemberku (in Trebnje)
 Log (in Škofja Loka) (known since 1951 as Na Logu)